GJ 9827 is a star in the constellation of Pisces. It is a K-type main-sequence star with an apparent magnitude of 10.250. It is 97 light-years (30 parsecs) away, based on parallax. 

The rotation period of the star cannot be determined as in 2020, and can be either around 15 or 30 days, depending on interpretation of available data.

Planetary system
It has 3 transiting planets seen by the Kepler space observatory in their K2 survey. As of October 2017, it is the closest star discovered to have transiting exoplanets found by either the Kepler or K2 missions. The planets (b, c, d) have radii of 1.62, 1.27, and 2.09 times that of the Earth, and periods of 1.209, 3.648, and 6.201 days (ratios 1:3:5). Because of its close distance the system is considered an excellent target for studying atmospherics of exoplanets. 

In late 2017, the masses of all three planets were determined using the Planet Finder Spectrograph on the Magellan II Telescope. Planet b was found to be very iron-rich, planet c appears to be mainly rocky, and planet d is a typical volatile-rich planet. GJ 9827b is noted as being one of the densest planets yet found, with its mass containing about ≥50% iron.

More precise radial velocity measurements released in late February 2018 revealed that all three planets have a lower density than Earth and have some amount of volatiles in their compositions. GJ 9827b and c are mainly rocky (containing less than 1% mass fraction of water, and negligible helium and hydrogen) with very thin volatile envelopes, while GJ 9827d is more akin to a Mini-Neptune. The loss of primordial atmosphere was indirectly confirmed in 2020 as no helium was detected at Gliese 9827 d though. With a mass of about 1.5 , GJ 9827c is one of the least massive planets detected with radial velocity. The atmospheres for GJ 9827b and GJ 9827d were not detected at all in 2021 observations.

References

External links 
 

Durchmusterung objects
9827
115752
K-type main-sequence stars
Planetary systems with three confirmed planets
Planetary transit variables
Pisces (constellation)
J23270480-0117108